Thway Thit Win Hlaing is a Burmese Lethwei fighter. He is the 2016 and 2018 Golden Belt Champion and is one of the most successful fighters of the World Lethwei Championship. He is known for his unassuming approach and patience and relies on counters rather than straight offense.

Lethwei career 
While Win Hlaing's precise fighting style may have left him less visible to fans, his career cannot be dismissed as forgettable, particularly after his rise to prominence in 2014. In 2017 he was part of the ONE Championship roster for a single match. The un-televised lethwei bout was held under the ruleset of the newly formed partnership with WLC

On Armed Forced Day in 2018, an event was held in Maungdaw, Rakhine State. A local wealthy entrepreneur invested in hosting the event which was green-lit by Senior General Min Aung Hlaing. The military has a long history of supporting Myanmar's traditional fighting arts. It was seen as a move by the military and pro-ethnic Rakhine that peace had returned and to avert attention from the Rohingya crisis. Win Hlaing was featured in the main event against Saw Ba Oo.

The fight between Win Hlaing and Reza at Win Sein in 2020 was almost called off as Win Hlaing was not feeling well. Before the fight they repeatedly checked his hydration levels to make sure he could compete. The fight ended up in his favour when he knocked Reza out in round 2.

The eagerly awaited fight between Win Hlaing and Soe Lin Oo whom he had never fought before, finally took place in 2022. However, the fight between Win Hlaing and Soe Lin Oo was reduced to only three rounds as a result of the aftermath of the 2021 Coup d'etat. The match-up between Win Hlaing and Soe Lin Oo promised to be a compelling watch as their fighting styles presented unique challenges for both fighters. Win Hlaing had previously lost to a pressure fighter, Tha Pyay Nyo, while Soe Lin Oo's only TKO loss was to a counter puncher, Shwe Yar Man.

Personal life 
Win Hlaing is the son of U Saw Win Shwe and Daw Nan Cho Cho Lay. His brother, Than Hlaing, had a brief career in boxing. Win Hlaing got married in Hpa-an on February 26, 2020, and has expressed his desire to have children.

Titles and accomplishments 
 Championships
 2018 Golden Belt Champion (71 kg)
 2016 Golden Belt Champion (67 kg)
 World Lethwei Championship
 WLC #2 Ranked Light Middleweight
 Lethwei World
 2019 Breakthrough fighter of the year

Lethwei record 

|- style="background:#;"
| 2023-03-23 ||  || align="left" | Pongsaklek Sor.Hengcharoen || Myanmar vs. Thailand Challenge Fights || Myawaddy, Myanmar ||  ||  || 
|- style="background:#c5d2ea;"
| 2023-03-05 || Draw || align="left" | Fahsura Khunkhao Phayayom || Myanmar vs. Thailand Challenge Fights || Hlaingbwe Township, Myanmar || Draw || 5 || 3:00
|- style="background:#cfc;"
| 2023-01-29 || Win || align="left" | Tun Tun Min || The Great Lethwei #3 || Yangon, Myanmar || Decision || 5 || 3:00
|- style="background:#c5d2ea;"
| 2022-12-22 || Draw || align="left" | Seeharach Lookmahathat || Kyar Inn village Karen New Year || Hlaingbwe Township, Myanmar || Draw || 5 || 3:00
|- style="background:#cfc;"
| 2022-11-27 || Win || align="left" | Soe Lin Oo || The Great Lethwei #1 || Yangon, Myanmar || Decision (Unanimous) || 5 || 3:00
|- style="background:#cfc;"
| 2022-11-09 || Win || align="left" | Aung Khaing || (67th) Karen State Day || Hpa-an, Myanmar || TKO || 5 || 
|- style="background:#c5d2ea;"
| 2022-08-20 || Draw || align="left" | Shuklaine Min || Shwe Koke Ko Myaing Challenge Fights || Myawaddy, Myanmar || Draw || 5 || 3:00
|-
! style=background:white colspan=9 |
|- style="background:#c5d2ea;"
| 2022-01-02 || Draw || align="left" | Soe Lin Oo || 27th Myainggyingu Karen New Year Challenge Fights || Myaing Gyi Ngu, Hpa-an District, Myanmar || Draw || 3 || 3:00
|- style="background:#c5d2ea;"
| 2021-11-07 || Draw || align="left" | Shuklaine Min || (66th) Karen State Day, Hpa-an Indoor sports complex || Hpa-an, Myanmar || Draw || 3 || 3:00
|- style="background:#c5d2ea;"
| 2021-02-18 || Draw || align="left" | Thway Thit Aung || Apaung village Challenge Fights || Hlaingbwe Township, Myanmar || Draw || 3 || 3:00
|- style="background:#c5d2ea;"
| 2021-02-12 || Draw || align="left" | Thway Thit Aung || (74th) Karen State Union Day, Zwekabin Natural Resort || Hpa-an, Myanmar || Draw || 3 || 3:00
|- style="background:#c5d2ea;"
| 2020-02-08 || Draw || align="left" | Fahphayap Kwaitonggym || (194th) Annual Lighting Festival || Kyondoe, Myanmar || Draw || 5 || 3:00
|- style="background:#cfc;"
| 2020-01-18 || Win || align="left" | Reza Ahmadnezhad || Win Sein Taw Ya 2020 || Mudon Township, Myanmar || TKO || 2 || 
|- style="background:#cfc;"
| 2020-01-06 || Win || align="left" | Jenrob Sujebamekieow || UMTA Lethwae Challenge || Yangon, Myanmar || KO || 1 || 
|- style="background:#c5d2ea;"
| 2019-12-13 || Draw || align="left" | Avatar Tor.Morsri || Mandalar Thiri Indoor Stadium || Mandalay, Myanmar || Draw || 5 || 3:00
|- style="background:#c5d2ea;"
| 2019-11-27 || Draw || align="left" | Boonpala Sitballsakon || Myaing Gyi Ngu Challenge Fights || Hpa-an District, Myanmar || Draw || 5 || 3:00
|- style="background:#cfc;"
| 2019-11-10 || Win || align="left" | Iquezang Kor.Rungthanakeat || 64th Karen State Day || Hpa-an, Myanmar || KO || 4 || 
|- style="background:#cfc;"
| 2019-10-04 || Win || align="left" | Burutlek Petchyindee Academy || World Lethwei Championship 10: Fearless Tigers || Mandalay, Myanmar || KO || 2 || 2:21 
|- style="background:#c5d2ea;"
| 2019-04-15 || Draw || align="left" | Singmanee Kaewsamrit || Kyauk Khet village Challenge Fights || Myawaddy Township, Myanmar || Draw || 5 || 3:00
|- style="background:#c5d2ea;"
| 2019-03-21 || Draw || align="left" | Petchnamnueng Amnat Muay Thai || Khalaung village, Ohn Ta Pin || Hpa-an Township, Myanmar || Draw || 5 || 3:00
|- style="background:#c5d2ea;"
| 2019-02-19 || Draw || align="left" | Fahsura Wor.Petchpoon || Shwe San Taw Pagoda Festival || Ye, Mon State, Myanmar || Draw || 5 || 3:00
|- style="background:#c5d2ea;"
| 2019-01-30 || Draw || align="left" | Sankom Sangmanee Gym || Win Sein Taw Ya 2019 || Mudon Township, Myanmar || Draw || 5 || 3:00
|- style="background:#c5d2ea;"
| 2018-11-26 || Draw || align="left" | Pongsaklek BCK Gym || Myaing Gyi Ngu Challenge Fights || Hpa-an District, Myanmar || Draw || 5 || 3:00
|- style="background:#c5d2ea;"
| 2018-11-10 || Draw || align="left" | Thway Thit Aung || (63rd) Kayin State Day || Hpa-an, Myanmar || Draw || 5 || 3:00
|- style="background:#cfc;"
| 2018-10-14 || Win || align="left" | Petsangnuan Sor.Chanasit || AH-GA Golden Belt Champions Challenge Fight || Yangon, Myanmar || KO || 2 || 1:43
|- style="background:#cfc;"
| 2018-08-10 || Win || align="left" | Shan Ko || Golden Belt Championship final || Yangon, Myanmar || Decision || 5 || 3:00
|-
! style=background:white colspan=9 |
|- style="background:#cfc;"
| 2018-07-21 || Win || align="left" | Min Htet Aung || Golden Belt Championship semi-final || Yangon, Myanmar || KO || 2 ||
|- style="background:#c5d2ea;"
| 2018-05-11 || Draw || align="left" | Pravit Sakmuangtalang || Kawt Darn Challenge Fights || Hpa-an, Myanmar || Draw || 5 || 3:00
|- style="background:#c5d2ea;"
| 2018-03-27 || Draw || align="left" | Saw Ba Oo || Armed Forces Day, Town Hall || Maungdaw, Rakhine State, Myanmar || Draw || 5 || 3:00
|- style="background:#c5d2ea;"
| 2018-02-25 || Draw || align="left" | Boonpala Petchasira || Shwe Kyat Min Monastery || Kawkareik Township, Myanmar || Draw || 5 || 3:00
|- style="background:#c5d2ea;"
| 2018-01-03 || Draw || align="left" | Shwe Yar Man || Lethwei Challenge Fights || Ye, Mon State, Myanmar || Draw || 5 || 3:00
|- style="background:#cfc;"
| 2017-11-04 || Win || align="left" | Shan Ko || World Lethwei Championship 3: Legendary Champions || Yangon, Myanmar || Decision || 1 || 1:55
|- style="background:#c5d2ea;"
| 2017-10-08 || Draw || align="left" | Saw Gaw Mu Do || GTG 5, Mandalar Thiri Stadium || Mandalay, Myanmar || Draw || 5 || 3:00
|- style="background:#cfc;"
| 2017-06-30 || Win || align="left" | Soe Htet Oo || ONE Championship: Light of a Nation || Yangon, Myanmar || Decision || 5 || 3:00
|- style="background:#cfc;"
| 2017-06-10 || Win || align="left" | Shwe Yar Man || World Lethwei Championship 2: Ancient Warriors || Yangon, Myanmar || Decision (Unanimous) || 5 || 3:00
|- style="background:#c5d2ea;"
| 2017-03-26 || Draw || align="left" | Shwe Yar Man || GTG 4, Thein Phyu Stadium || Yangon, Myanmar || Draw || 5 || 3:00 
|- style="background:#cfc;"
| 2017-03-03 || Win || align="left" | Saw Ba Oo || World Lethwei Championship 1: The Great Beginning || Yangon, Myanmar || Decision (Unanimous) || 5 || 3:00
|- style="background:#cfc;"
| 2017-01-06 || Win || align="left" | Petchpirun NK Fitnessmuaythai || Myanmar-Thai-Lao Challenge Fights || Mandalay, Myanmar || KO || 2 ||
|- style="background:#c5d2ea;"
| 2016-12-19 || Draw || align="left" | Samson Phran26 || (22nd) DKBA Anniversary || Myawaddy Township, Myanmar || Draw || 5 || 3:00 
|- style="background:#cfc;"
| 2016-11-27 || Win || align="left" | Phoe La Pyae || Mandalay Rumbling Challenge Fight || Yangon, Myanmar || KO || 1 ||
|- style="background:#c5d2ea;"
| 2016-11-10 || Draw || align="left" | Phosailek Petchphosai || (61st) Kayin State Day || Hpa-an, Myanmar || Draw || 5 || 3:00 
|- style="background:#cfc;"
| 2016-07-10 || Win || align="left" | Ye Tagon || Golden Belt Championship final || Yangon, Myanmar || Decision (Unanimous) || 5 || 3:00
|-
! style=background:white colspan=9 |
|- style="background:#cfc;"
| 2016-07-03 || Win || align="left" | Phoe La Pyae || Golden Belt Championship semi-final || Yangon, Myanmar || KO || 5 ||
|- style="background:#cfc;"
| 2016-06-26 || Win || align="left" | Bo Soe Aung || Golden Belt Championship quarter-final || Yangon, Myanmar || KO || 1 ||
|- style="background:#c5d2ea;"
| 2016-04-18 || Draw || align="left" | Ye Tagon || Don Yein Myay Waterfall || Kayin State, Myanmar || Draw || 5 || 3:00 
|- style="background:#cfc;"
| 2016-01-10 || Win || align="left" | Petchseethong || Shwe Koke Ko Myaing Challenge Fights || Myawaddy, Myanmar || KO || 3 ||
|- style="background:#cfc;"
| 2015-11-12 || Win || align="left" | Fahmeechai Chor.Chanathip || (60th) Kayin State Day || Hpa-an, Myanmar || KO || 4 ||
|- style="background:#c5d2ea;"
| 2015-04-19 || Draw || align="left" | Thway Thit Aung || Lethwei Challenge Fights || Kayin State, Myanmar || Draw || 5 || 3:00
|- style="background:#c5d2ea;"
| 2015-02-05 || Draw || align="left" | Phoe La Pyae || Taungbon Challenge Fights || Ye Township, Myanmar || Draw || 5 || 3:00
|- style="background:#c5d2ea;"
| 2014-12-30 || Draw || align="left" | Phyan Thway || Lethwei Challenge Fights || Mandalay, Myanmar || Draw || 5 || 3:00
|- style="background:#c5d2ea;"
| 2014-11-11 || Draw || align="left" | Phoe La Pyae || (59th) Kayin State Day || Hpa-an, Myanmar || Draw || 5 || 3:00
|- style="background:#c5d2ea;"
| 2014-01-24 || Draw || align="left" | Kongchumphae Tor.Pornchai || Win Sein Taw Ya 2014 || Mudon Township, Myanmar || Draw || 5 || 3:00
|- style="background:#c5d2ea;"
| 2014-01-18 || Draw || align="left" | Thway Thit Aung || Taung Ka Lay Challenge Fights || Hpa-an, Myanmar || Draw || 5 || 3:00
|- style="background:#cfc;"
| 2013-12-31 || Win || align="left" | One Star || Karen New Year 2753, Pay Pin Seik village || Hpa-an, Myanmar || KO || 3 ||
|- style="background:#cfc;"
| 2013-05-02 || Win || align="left" | Saw William || Lethwei Challenge Fights || Mon State, Myanmar || KO || 2 ||
|- style="background:#fbb;"
| 2013-04-25 || Loss || align="left" | Tha Pyay Nyo || Thaung Pyin Challenge Fights || Mon State, Myanmar || TKO || 4 ||
|- style="background:#fff;"
| 2013-01-12 || || align="left" | Kyar Pauk || Myaing Kone Tan Gyi Village || Kayin State, Myanmar ||  ||  || 
|- style="background:#cfc;"
| 2012-01-18 || Win || align="left" | Tun Win Aung || Win Sein Taw Ya 2012 || Mudon Township, Myanmar || KO || 1 ||
|- style="background:#c5d2ea;"
| 2011-08-13 || Draw || align="left" | Win Mauk || Myanmar-Japan Goodwill Letwhay Competition || Yangon, Myanmar || Draw || 4 || 3:00
|- style="background:#fff;"
| 2008-12-20 || || align="left" |  || D.K.B.A 14th Anniversary || Myaing Gyi Ngu, Hpa-an District, Myanmar ||  ||  || 
|-
| colspan=9 | Legend:

References

Living people
Burmese Lethwei practitioners
1995 births